Tetsuo (written: , ,  or ) is a masculine Japanese given name. Notable people with the name include:

, Japanese manga artist
, Japanese middle-distance runner
, Japanese table tennis player
, Japanese astronomer
, Japanese politician
, American historian
, Japanese politician
, Japanese jazz fusion bassist
, Japanese rower
, Japanese volleyball player
, Japanese film director
Tetsuo Toyama (当山 哲夫, 18831971), Okinawan journalist

Fictional characters
, a character in the manga series Hikaru no Go
Tetsuo Okita, a character in the film The Bullet Train
, a character in the manga series Akira
Tetsuo Sinkkonen, a character in the film Vares: Private Eye
, protagonist of the manga series Interviews with Monster Girls
Tetsuo Nikaido, Main Antagonist of Yakuza: Dead Souls
Tetsuo Takeda, a character in the anime series Yu-Gi-Oh! Zexal

Japanese masculine given names